Alex Thomas Cairns (born 4 January 1993) is an English professional footballer who plays as a goalkeeper for Salford City, on loan from League One side Fleetwood Town.

Club career

Breaking through
Cairns began his career in the Leeds United youth academy and turned professional with the club at the end of the 2010–11 season by signing a one-year contract along with fellow youth players and twins Nathan and Lewis Turner. The following season would see Cairns join the senior team as cover for Paul Rachubka after first choice goalkeeper Andy Lonergan sustained a finger injury. Rachubka's time in the side was marked by a series of errors; three of which would come in the first half of a league match against his former club Blackpool. With Leeds 3–0 down at half time, Cairns replaced him for the second half, conceding twice as Blackpool won 5–0.

Following the Blackpool game, manager Simon Grayson expressed his doubts as to whether Cairns was ready to take on the responsibility of starting in the first-team for the remaining period of Lonergan's absence. Prior to the next match against Leicester City, Grayson brought in young Reading goalkeeper Alex McCarthy on an emergency loan. Nevertheless, Cairns was promoted ahead of Rachubka and retained his position on the bench for the following weeks until Grayson signed veteran goalkeeper Maik Taylor on a short-term basis to act as cover.

Cairns signed a new two-year deal at the club on 19 January. At the end of the January transfer window, Cairns joined Conference National side Barrow on a one-month loan. Cairns failed to play a game for Barrow after being an unused substitute in several games and returned to Leeds on 2 March after his loan at Barrow expired. He made no further appearances in the first-team squad at Leeds for the remainder of the season as new manager Neil Warnock favoured five outfield players on the bench.

Stalybridge Celtic loan
After falling down the pecking order at Leeds following the signings of two new goalkeepers, Cairns joined Conference North side Stalybridge Celtic on a month-long loan after first-choice goalkeeper Andy Ralph suffered a suspected broken leg in the Badgers' opening game of the season. He made his debut for the club at their Bower Field ground in a 1–1 draw against Gainsborough Trinity and kept his first clean sheet later that week in a 0–0 stalemate against Droylsden. He featured for Celtic in a 2–1 friendly victory over a Manchester United XI which included Darren Fletcher and Alexander Büttner on 11 September. He remained an ever-present for the club since arriving until he was substituted in an early-round FA Cup match on 22 September versus Vauxhall Motors after sustaining a dead-leg following a collision with an opposing player. His loan spell was extended until the end of November during which he reached the final qualifying round of the FA Cup with the Badgers before succumbing to Conference National side Stockport County in a 3–5 defeat at Edgeley Park.

At Stalybridge Celtic's end of season awards on 27 April 2013, Cairns won the Player of the Year, Players' Player of the Year and Supporters' Player of the Year awards.

Return to Leeds United
After an injury to Jamie Ashdown for the final home game of the season, Cairns was recalled to Leeds on 26 April 2013, and was named on the bench against Brighton & Hove Albion on 27 April.

Following an injury to Jamie Ashdown during the following pre-season, Cairns was promoted to second choice goalkeeper, providing backup for Paddy Kenny and then loan goalkeeper Jack Butland. He remained second choice at Leeds even after Kenny's return from injury. On 16 May 2014, Cairns extended his contract with Leeds by a further year.

On 13 May 2015, Cairns was released by Leeds United after his contract expired.

Chesterfield
On 29 July 2015, Cairns signed a six-month contract at Chesterfield. He left the club on 7 January 2016 after his contract expired, having made no appearances.

Rotherham United
The day after his release from Chesterfield, Cairns signed a contract with Rotherham United until the end of the season. The move reunited him with Rotherham manager Neil Redfearn, who had previously been his academy manager at Leeds United.

Fleetwood Town
In July 2016, Cairns signed for League One club Fleetwood Town, where he went on to establish himself in the first team. He played a total of 81 games in his first two seasons at the club, keeping 34 clean sheets. On 26 November 2022, Cairns joined League Two side Hartlepool United on a seven-day emergency loan deal. On 4 January 2023, Cairns joined League Two side Salford City on loan for the remainder of the 2022-23 season.

Personal life
In November 2014, Cairns' 16-year-old brother Blake was killed in a two car collision in Conisbrough alongside four other teenagers, three of whom attended Danum Academy Sixth Form with the other having previously attended the Sixth Form. His funeral was attended by Cairns and several members of the Leeds first-team squad.

Career statistics

References

External links

1993 births
Living people
Footballers from Doncaster
English footballers
Association football goalkeepers
Leeds United F.C. players
Barrow A.F.C. players
Stalybridge Celtic F.C. players
Chesterfield F.C. players
Rotherham United F.C. players
Fleetwood Town F.C. players
Hartlepool United F.C. players
Salford City F.C. players
English Football League players
National League (English football) players